Turok: Son of Stone is a 2008 American adult animated science fiction action adventure film featuring the Western Publishing character of the same name, produced by Classic Media and distributed by Genius Products.

Plot 
Turok, a Native American warrior, avenges the slaughter of his family while fighting dinosaurs and another Native American named Chichak who now leads a hostile tribe of Cavemen.

Voice cast
 Adam Beach as Turok
 Irene Bedard as Catori
 Adam Gifford as Andar
 Cree Summer as Sepinta
 Jay Tavare as Koba
 Mia Crowe as Aniwa
 Robert Knepper as Chichak
 Gil Birmingham as Nashoba
 Rick Mora as Young Turok / Cliff Person
 Iyari Limon as Young Catori
 Matthew Yang King as Young Nashoba / Young Cliff Brave
 Michael Horse as Chief / Lead Raider
 Russell Means as Shaman / Chief Sentry
 Graham Greene as Lost Land Shaman / Elder #1
 Tatanka Means as Bridge Sentry
 Peter Macon as Tower Sentry
 Tom Virtue as Old Man

Reception
Geek.com said that "although there are no Oscar-worthy performances, Turok: Son of Stone has a lot of heart".

References

External links
 

2008 animated films
2008 films
2000s adventure films
2008 drama films
2008 fantasy films
2000s animated superhero films
American adventure drama films
American animated science fiction films
Animated adventure films
Animated drama films
Animated films about animals
Animated films about dinosaurs
Animated films based on comics
Animated films set in prehistory
DreamWorks Classics
Film Roman films
Films about cannibalism
Films about Native Americans
Films set in North America
Turok
Films directed by Tad Stones
2000s English-language films
2000s American films